Akşahap is a village in the District of Akseki, Antalya Province, Turkey.
People of this village descend from Teke Turkmens.

References

Villages in Akseki District